Achranoxia sijesowi is a species of beetle, first discovered by Edmund Reitter in 1913. No sub-species are listed at the Catalogue of Life.

References

Beetles
Beetles described in 1913